The Kiseong was a Go competition in South Korea.

Outline 
The Kiseong was a Go competition used by the Hanguk Kiwon. It was the Hanguk Kiwon equivalent to the Nihon-Kiin's Kisei competition and was sponsored by the Segye Ilbo (World Newspaper). The white komi was 6.5 points. The time limits for the final was five hours, while the rest of the tournament had four hours of thinking time. The winner's purse was 18,000,000 SKW ($18,000).

The last year of the competition was 2008.

Past winners

See also
Kisei

Kisung